Harry Payne may refer to:

Harry Payne (artist) (1858–1927), English military artist
Harry Payne (athlete) (1892–1969), English marathoner
Harry Payne (politician) (born 1952), American politician
Harry Payne (rugby union) (1907–2000), Welsh international rugby player
Harry D. Payne (1891–1987), St. Louis architect most notable for Houston-area structures
Harry Vearle Payne (1908–1984), U.S. federal judge
Harry C. Payne, 14th president of Williams College
Harry Payne of the Payne Brothers, pantomime act

See also
Henry Payne (disambiguation)
Harold Payne (disambiguation)